Jorge Ramos is an Uruguayan sports commentator, who started out in the U.S. as a writer and editor in La Raza, a top Spanish-language newspaper based in Chicago. Before joining ESPN, he and Hernan Pereyra co-hosted Univision Radio’s national program, Locura por el Futbol.

Currently, Ramos has a 3-hour national live program on ESPN+. His program carries the hit name, 
Jorge Ramos y Su Banda. It previously broadcast simultaneously on TV and radio, Monday through Friday from 4pm to 7pm EST before moving to ESPN+ on November 9, 2020.

Career 
Jorge Ramos is known as “el relator de America” – the commentator of the Americas – and is synonymous with football for millions of fans in the U.S. Now the renowned Spanish-language sportscaster joins ESPN Deportes Radio as the lead voice of the football lineup. With his trademark combination of enthusiasm and knowledge, Ramos brings out the game’s finer points and punctuates them with his unique sense of humor on his weekday show, “Jorge Ramos y Su Banda.”

In his illustrious thirty-year career, Ramos has served as play-by-play commentator for over 3,000 football matches, including 1,400 Liga MX games.  He has covered four FIFA World Cups, the 2003 Women’s World Cup, two Copa Américas and several UEFA European Championships.

Although he is best known for his football commentary, Ramos has an in-depth knowledge of all sports that has put him front and center of major sporting events across the world. These include broadcasting the Pan American Games, providing in-depth coverage of the 2000 Sydney Olympics and serving as the Spanish-language voice of the Los Angeles Lakers. One of the most gratifying moments in his career was providing play-by-play for the 1986 World Cup – the first-ever World Cup on Spanish-language radio in the U.S.

Ramos is also the spokesperson for National Automobile Parts Association (NAPA), having done commercials both in English and Spanish.

Personal 
Ramos is actively involved with the International Kids Fund, a philanthropic program of the Jackson Memorial Foundation committed to helping critically ill children.

Jorge lives in Miami with his wife, Maria Ramos. He has two adult children Carol & Diego.

Experience

Radio 
 KPLS 830 AM (1994-1998)
 Radio Unica (1998-2004)
 Univisión Radio (2004-2005)
 ESPN Deportes Radio (2005–2019)

Television 
 Telemundo (1994-2000)
 Univisión (2002-2006)
 Fox Sports en Español (2006-2009)
 ESPN Deportes (2009–present)

References 

ESPN people
American sports journalists
Living people
Uruguayan expatriates in the United States
Year of birth missing (living people)